Early to Bet is a 1951 Warner Bros. Merrie Melodies theatrical cartoon short directed by Robert McKimson. The short was released on May 12, 1951, and features the Gambling Bug.

Plot
The narrator introduces the Gambling Bug, demanding he stand up so everyone can get a look at him. Three examples are then offered, showing what happens should this Gambling Bug "bite" someone, giving them "gambling fever". First, a restaurant customer is seen coaxing a frustrated waiter (named Luigi) to allow another in what has clearly been a series of coin flips to determine payment for a meal.  Next, two men at a bar bet five dollars ("five bucks") that a buzzing fly will land on one or another glass of beer first. Then, another man puts a coin in a casino slot machine and watches the wheels spin around until three oranges appear. He jumps for joy until he sees the payout is three actual oranges instead of a money jackpot. Enraged, he begins punching the slot machine.

After that introductory segment closes with a somber warning for "folks" (the audience) to watch out for the Gambling Bug, the bug chooses to leave his victims alone for a day, and goes on vacation. Out walking, the bug is surprised by a dog who strides by and pulls a black and white cat from beneath a farm building. The dog, apparently a card sharp, suggests the cat might like to play cards for penalties. The cat adamantly refuses, says he is through playing cards with the dog and, somewhat irritated, goes to sit on a nearby log. The Gambling Bug immediately sees this as an irresistible opportunity and bites the cat's ear.

Now the cat, wound-up and anxious to bet, dashes back to the dog repeating, "Gimme the cards, deal 'em out, let's go, come on!" They play gin rummy for penalties and the cat promptly loses. After he briefly transforms into a "sucker" (a lollipop), he dejectedly heads over to and spins the Penalty Wheel. He lands on Number 14: "The Gesundheit", which he finds out when picking the appropriate file out of a nearby file drawer. He begs not to be punished with Raymond Scott's Powerhouse (section B) music as background, still he is forced to blow bubble gum as the dog shakes "sneeze powder" (pepper) on his nose; the resulting huge sneeze causes the bubble gum to completely cover the cat. After the dog says 'Gesundheit', the cat becomes enraged and tries to break free from the gum.

The cat refuses to play cards any longer and sits back down on the log.  The Gambling Bug speaks into his ear, "We gotta play percentage.  We'll try again," and bites the cat's ear again.  Excitedly looking to get even, he sits down with the dog once more and, in spite of trying to play smart, instantly loses again. This time the Penalty Wheel lands on Number 75: "The William Tell". This entails the dog using a bow to fire, Robin Hood-like, a toilet plunger at an apple on the cat's head.  The cat ensures the biggest apple possible is poised so the dog will not miss, but the plunger is aimed, successfully, into the cat's face. The cat pulls the plunger off his face and starts jumping on it in anger.

Before biting the ear a third time, the Gambling Bug suggests the cat is due for a winning streak. But, as the bug is saying to himself, "He can't lose all the time," we hear the dog announce, "Gin again." The bug replies "Or can he?". The Penalty Wheel stops at Number 36: "Roll Out the Barrel". The dog fires a starter pistol and the cat rolls a barrel, trailing gunpowder, along a hilly road into the distance. The dog puts a match to the powder, which burns exceptionally quickly and blows the cat back to where he started.

Hobbling up with a broken leg, influenced yet again by the Gambling Bug's bite, the cat tries to play but the dog refuses, declaring the cat too unlucky and walks out. The bug steps in and suggests he and the cat cut the deck for the highest card. The cat draws a three of hearts. The Gambling Bug says, "Not so good, cat. Watch!" and is shocked when he ends up drawing a two of diamonds. The cat decides the penalty will be "The Post", which means the cat will attempt to whack the Gambling Bug with a Post newspaper.

Production notes
The Gambling Bug is a small character who infects others with the desire to gamble. He wears a green tie, a red jacket, a brown hat and a white tuxedo. Early to Bet is his only appearance.

The cartoon is a sequel to the 1950 short It's Hummer Time, which featured the same bulldog giving the same cat elaborate punishments.

The Gambling Bug makes a brief cameo at the basketball game in Space Jam. The dog makes another appearance in It's Hummer Time. The cat made his fourth appearance in a Robert McKimson short and would make his final one later in 1951 in Leghorn Swoggled, but was not given a name.

Home media
Early to Bet was released on DVD in 2003 as part of Looney Tunes Golden Collection: Volume 1.

References

External links
 

1951 animated films
1951 short films
1951 films
Merrie Melodies short films
Warner Bros. Cartoons animated short films
Films directed by Robert McKimson
1950s Warner Bros. animated short films
Films scored by Carl Stalling
1950s English-language films
American films about gambling